Eastmont may refer to:

Eastmont, California
Eastmont, Washington
Eastmont School District, Douglas County, Washington
Eastmont Town Center, East Oakland, California

See also
 East Mountain (disambiguation)